Barbara Joy McIntire (born January 12, 1935) is an American amateur golfer.

McIntire was  born in Toledo, Ohio. Living in Florida, she began playing golf as a young girl and at age 15 made a splash at the 1950 U.S. Women's Amateur by eliminating six-time Champion Glenna Collett Vare in the opening round. She finished runner-up at the 1951 and 1952 U.S. Girls' Junior.

A student at Rollins College in Winter Park, Florida in 1956, McIntire came close to becoming the first amateur to win the U.S. Women's Open when she was tied with professional Kathy Cornelius at the end of regulation play but lost in the ensuing playoff. In 1957, she won the first of her six North and South Women's Amateurs then in 1959 at the U.S. Women's Amateur she defeated the reigning champion Anne Quast in the quarter-finals and went on to win the tournament. The following year, she won the 1960 British Ladies Amateur, becoming one of eight women to simultaneously hold the American and British titles and earning her the cover of Sports Illustrated magazine. She also won the Women's Western Amateur in 1958 and 1963.

A member of the U.S. Curtis Cup team in 1958, 1960, 1962, 1964, 1966 and 1972, McIntire won her second U.S. Women's Amateur in 1964 and went on to dedicate herself to the game of golf, serving on the United States Golf Association Women's Committee from 1985-1996 and its chairperson for 1995 and 1996.

McIntire was inducted into the Colorado Golf Hall of Fame in 1964, the Ohio Golf Hall of Fame in 1995 and the Colorado Sports Hall of Fame in 1998. In 2000, she was voted the Bob Jones Award, the highest honor given by the United States Golf Association in recognition of distinguished sportsmanship in golf.

U. S. national Team appearances
Amateur
Curtis Cup: 1958 (tie), 1960 (winners), 1962 (winners), 1964 (winners), 1966 (winners), 1972 (winners), 1976 (non-playing captain, winners), 1998 (non-playing captain, winners)
Espirito Santo Trophy: 1964

References

American female golfers
Amateur golfers
Rollins Tars women's golfers
Winners of ladies' major amateur golf championships
Golfers from Ohio
Golfers from Florida
Sportspeople from Toledo, Ohio
1935 births
Living people